Westcliffe is a statutory town that is the county seat of Custer County, Colorado, United States.  At the 2010 U.S. Census, the population was 568, up from 417 in 2000.

History
Westcliffe had its start in 1881 when the Denver and Rio Grande Western Railroad was extended to that point.

Geography
Westcliffe is located west of the geographic center of Custer County at  (38.132874, -105.465920). It lies in the Wet Mountain Valley, between the Wet Mountains to the east and the Sangre de Cristo Range to the west. The town of Silver Cliff is immediately to the east of Westcliffe.

Climate

Dark skies
Westcliffe, and neighboring Silver Cliff, Colorado, are recognized as IDA International Dark Sky Communities by The International Dark-Sky Association. Gentle persuasion has resulted in residents and business in the towns and surrounding ranch land reducing the amount of light pollution.

Locals have set up a free observatory in an old period building with a "roll-off" roof to open up the 14-inch Schmidt-Cassegrain telescope with computer-guided pointing and tracking to the skies overhead.  Named the Smokey Jack Observatory, it was built in 2015.

Demographics

As of the census of 2000, there were 417 people, 194 households, and 108 families residing in the town. The racial makeup of the town was 95.44% White, 1.92% Native American, 0.24% Asian, and 2.40% from two or more races. Hispanic or Latino of any race were 2.16% of the population.

There were 194 households, out of which 23.2% had children under the age of 18 living with them, 46.9% were married couples living together, 6.2% had a female householder with no husband present, and 44.3% were non-families. 42.3% of all households were made up of individuals, and 19.1% had someone living alone who was 65 years of age or older.  The average household size was 2.11 and the average family size was 2.91.

In the town, the population was spread out, with 22.3% under the age of 18, 6.5% from 18 to 24, 23.3% from 25 to 44, 31.9% from 45 to 64, and 16.1% who were 65 years of age or older.  The median age was 44 years. For every 100 females, there were 93.1 males.  For every 100 females age 18 and over, there were 98.8 males.

The median income for a household in the town was $23,125, and the median income for a family was $36,250. Males had a median income of $28,542 versus $18,750 for females. The per capita income for the town was $14,047.  About 14.4% of families and 20.4% of the population were below the poverty line, including 29.5% of those under age 18 and 10.3% of those age 65 or over.

Notable people 
Anne Kimbell (1932–2017), actress and founder of the Westcliffe Center for the Performing Arts
Adolph Treidler (1886-1981), artist, born in Westcliffe
Gordon Clark (1902-1985), philosopher and theologian, buried near Westcliffe

See also

Outline of Colorado
Index of Colorado-related articles
State of Colorado
Colorado cities and towns
Colorado municipalities
Colorado counties
Custer County, Colorado

References

External links

Town of Westcliffe official website

Towns in Custer County, Colorado
Towns in Colorado
County seats in Colorado